Kyle Trent Skipworth (born March 1, 1990) is an American former professional baseball catcher. He played in Major League Baseball (MLB) for the Miami Marlins in 2013.

Career
Skipworth attended Patriot High School. He won the Gatorade High School Baseball Player of the Year Award in 2008.

Florida/Miami Marlins
Skipworth was drafted in the first round (sixth overall) of the 2008 amateur draft by the Florida Marlins. and began his professional career that year. He hit .208 in 43 games with the GCL Marlins. In 2009, he hit .208 in 70 games with the Greensboro Grasshoppers of the Class A South Atlantic League. He split 2010 between the Grasshoppers (107 games) and Jacksonville Suns of the Class AA Southern League (two games), hitting .245 with 17 home runs and 59 RBIs. Playing for the Suns in 2012, he batted .217 with 21 home runs and 63 RBIs.

In spring training in 2013, Skipworth competed with Miguel Olivo for a spot on the 25-man roster as a backup catcher to Rob Brantly, the starter, following an injury to Jeff Mathis. Olivo won the role, and Skipworth was optioned to the New Orleans Zephyrs of the Class AAA Pacific Coast League before the start of the season. On April 5, the Marlins promoted Skipworth to the major leagues when they placed Casey Kotchman on the disabled list. He was designated for assignment on December 18, 2013. Skipworth played the 2014 season with New Orleans, and became a free agent at the end of the season.

Cincinnati Reds
He signed with the Cincinnati Reds in the offseason and was a non-roster invitee to 2015 spring training. The Reds called him up to the major leagues on April 13, 2015.  The Reds optioned Skipworth  to their AA affiliate, the Pensacola Blue Wahoos, on June 5, 2016 on June 9, 2016, The Reds activated Skipworth the 60 day DL and outrighted him to Pensacola.

References

External links

Living people
1990 births
Baseball players from Riverside, California
Major League Baseball catchers
Miami Marlins players
Gulf Coast Marlins players
Greensboro Grasshoppers players
Jacksonville Suns players
New Orleans Zephyrs players
Phoenix Desert Dogs players
Surprise Saguaros players
Pensacola Blue Wahoos players